Darcie Little Badger (born 1987) is an author and an Earth scientist.

As an author, she specializes in speculative fiction, especially horror, science fiction and fantasy. Further, as a Lipan Apache, she develops her stories with Apache characters and themes.  She has also added her voice to Indigenous Futurisms, a movement among Native artists and authors to write science fiction from their historical and cultural perspectives. At the same time, some of her works feature characters who reconfirm the presence and importance of LGBTQ+ community-members.

Family and education 
Darcie Little Badger was born Darcie Erin Ryan to Patrick Ryan, an English professor, and Hermelinda Walking Woman, the webmaster of the Lipan Apache Tribe of Texas After graduating with honors from Pleasant Grove High School in Texarkana, Texas, she attended Princeton University in New Jersey, where she earned a bachelor's degree in Geosciences. Little Badger graduated cum laude and was honored by her department with the Arthur F. Buddington Award for Overall Excellence as an undergraduate student. She subsequently enrolled in the doctoral program in oceanography at Texas A&M University, College Station, where she earned a Ph.D. She wrote her dissertation on the genomics of Karenia brevis, a species of plankton that causes toxic red tide in the Gulf of Mexico. For her research, she received a Ford Dissertation Fellowship  and TAMU's Chapman Award for Graduate Student Research, both under the name under the name Darcie Ryan. She also serves as a delegate for the Tribe to the National Congress of American Indians.

Short fiction and Apache influence 
Little Badger's short fiction has appeared in a range of publications, including Strange Horizons, Fantasy Magazine, Mythic Delirium, and The Dark Magazine, among others.  Notably, Little Badger enriches her short stories with Apache history and lore. For example, two Apache sisters reunite in "Whalebone Parrot" (The Dark Magazine, 2017), a Victorian horror story set in the late 19th century on an island in the Atlantic.  During the conflict between their tribe and the U.S. Army, the women were orphaned and grew up together in a residential "Indian school". Thus, as Little Badger notes, her story is rooted in Lipan Apache history, a history that "few remember". Similarly, in "Owl vs. the Neighborhood Watch" (Strange Horizons, 2017), she revives Native legend when she places Owl, a shape-shifting supernatural harbinger of evil, in a story set in contemporary Appalachia.

Debut novel, Elatsoe 
Little Badger's debut novel Elatsoe was released in August 2020 by publisher Levine Querido and made the Indibound Young Adult bestseller list in its first week. The story is set in modern-day Texas; the main character Ellie is a seventeen-year-old Lipan Apache. Ellie is accompanied by the ghost of her pet dog Kirby. She has used her grandmothers' traditional techniques to bring him back to life.  Kirby and Ellie are joined by Ellie's friend and classmate Jay as they work to solve the murder of her cousin. At the same time, they confront an enclave of vampires plaguing people near Willowbee, a mysterious town in South Texas.

Indigenous Futurisms 
Indigenous Futurisms is a growing movement in the arts and literature in which Native writers create science fiction and fantasy with characters and themes drawn from indigenous cultures. In 2012, Prof. Grace Dillon formalized the study of Indigenous Futurisms with publication of Walking the Clouds: An Anthology of Indigenous Science Fiction. With much of her science fiction, Little Badger has contributed to Indigenous Futurisms. In Strangelands, for example, Little Badger introduces an Apache comic book superhero. In her short story "Né łe!" the main characters are a Navajo interplanetary ship's captain and a Lipan Apache veterinarian accompanying 40 chihuahuas on their way to forever homes on Mars.

Published works

Novels

Short fiction

Nonfiction
 "When Danger is Announced" in Nightmare Magazine Issue 83 (August 2019)
 "Decolonizing Science Fiction and Imagining Futures: An Indigenous Futurisms Roundtable" in Strange Horizons Issue 30 (January 2017) with Rebecca Roanhorse, Elizabeth LaPensee, and Johnnie Jae
 "Writer's Manifesto: Interview with Darcie Little Badger" in Cicada Magazine Volume 19 (July/August 2017)

Awards and honors

For Elatsoe
2021-2022 Whippoorwill Book Award Winner
2022 American Indian Youth Literature Awards Honor Book
2021 Locus Award First Novel Winner
2021 Lodestar Award for Best Young Adult Book Finalist
2020 Andre Norton Nebula Award for Middle Grade and Young Adult Fiction Finalist
Global Read Aloud Selection-Young Adult
Golden Kite Award Honor-Young Adult Fiction
A National Indie Bestseller, 12 weeks
PNBA Bestseller
Time Best 100 Fantasy Books of All Time
An NPR Best Book of 2020
A BookPage Best Book of 2020
CPL's Best of the Best Books of 2020
A Publishers Weekly Best Book of 2020
A Buzzfeed's Best YA SFF Book of 2020
A Shelf Awareness's Best Children's & Teen Books of 2020 
A NEIBA Windows & Mirrors Selection
A NEIBA Book Award Finalist 
A Tor Best Book of 2020
A Kirkus Best YA Book of 2020

For A Snake Falls to Earth
2022 Ignite Awards: Best Novel Young Adults Winner
The Inaugural Ursula K. Le Guin Prize for Fiction Shortlist
 Andre Norton Nebula Award for Middle Grade and Young Adult Fiction winner
2022 Lodestar Award for Best Young Adult Book Finalist
2022 Newberry Honor Book
2022 YALSA Best Fiction for Young Adults
LA Times Book Awards YA Literature 2021 Finalist
2021 National Book Awards Longlist for Young People's Literature 
A Publishers Weekly Best Book of 2021
A National Indie Bestseller, 8 weeks
A Kirkus’ Best of 2021-YA Books
A Tor.com Reviewer's Choice The Best Books of 2021
A New York Public Library Best Books of 2021: Teens
A CPL's Best of the Best Books of 2021: Teens

References

External links 
 Darcie Little Badger Diary-Online
 Lipan Apache Tribe Official Website
 National Congress of American Indians

Living people
21st-century Native Americans
American earth scientists
American horror writers
Native American writers
People from Morris, Minnesota
Princeton University alumni
Texas A&M University alumni
Native American scientists
Writers from Minnesota
Women science fiction and fantasy writers
Apache people
Native American women writers
American comics writers
Female comics writers
1987 births
21st-century Native American women
Asexual women
Novelists from Minnesota
21st-century American short story writers
American women short story writers
American LGBT writers
American LGBT scientists
21st-century earth scientists
Nebula Award winners
Native American women scientists